U.S. Route 227 (US 227) was a U.S. Highway that was commissioned in Kentucky from 1928 to 1972, and ran from Richmond to Carrollton.

Route description
US 227 began in Richmond, intersecting US 25 and US 421 as well as Kentucky Route 52. The route headed north to the Kentucky River at Fort Boonesborough. US 227 then entered Winchester, intersecting US 60 and Kentucky Route 15 and Kentucky Route 89 before continuing north and intersecting Kentucky Route 13. In Paris, the highway intersected US 27 and US 60 before running concurrently with US 460 west through Centreville and across Kentucky Route 922 into Georgetown. There, the highway briefly ran concurrently with US 62, and intersected US 25, before both US 460 and US 25 split off and US 227 continued northwest through Stamping Ground.

In Owen County, the highway went through Owenton, Long Ridge, and New Liberty, intersecting several routes along the way, and running concurrently with Kentucky Route 22 near Owenton. US 227 had its northern terminus in Carrollton, Kentucky, at US 42 near the Ohio River.

History
The current designation of the road is:
 Kentucky Route 388 from Richmond to near Fort Boonesborough
 Kentucky Route 627 from near Fort Boonesborough to Paris via Winchester
 overlapped U.S. Route 460 from Paris to Georgetown
 Kentucky Route 227 from Georgetown to Owenton
overlapped U.S. Route 127 from Owenton to north of Long Ridge
overlapped Kentucky Route 36 from north of Long Ridge to New Liberty
Kentucky Route 227 from New Liberty to Carrollton

Major intersections
The list below includes most intersections of US 227 before its 1972 decommission.

References

External links
Endpoints of US 227

2
27-2
27-2
27-2